Lirak (also Romanized as Līrak) is a village in Piveshk Rural District, Lirdaf District, Jask County, Hormozgan Province, Iran. At the 2006 census, its population was 72, in 19 families.

References 

Populated places in Jask County